Rudy Kuechenberg (born February 7, 1943) is a former professional American football linebacker who played in the National Football League (NFL) for five seasons with the following teams: Chicago Bears, Green Bay Packers, Cleveland Browns, and Atlanta Falcons. His brother, Bob Kuechenberg, was an All-Pro offensive lineman with the Miami Dolphins.

References

1943 births
American football linebackers
Chicago Bears players
Green Bay Packers players
Cleveland Browns players
Atlanta Falcons players
Indiana Hoosiers football players
Living people
People from Hobart, Indiana